() is a Mon language chronicle. It is supposedly part of a larger treatise called Ramann'-uppatti-dipaka ("An Explanation of the Origins of Ramannadesa"). The surviving copy of Nidana is dated to the 18th century although the copy says its original manuscript was compiled in year 900 ME (1538/39 CE). Moreover, at least some parts of it were likely written during the early 17th century.

References

Bibliography
 
 
 Shorto, Harry L. Nidana Ramadhipati-katha. Unpublished typescript translation of pp. 34-44, 61-264 of Phra Candakanto (editor). On binding Rajawamsa Dhammaceti Mahapitakadhara. Pak Lat, Siam (1912). No Date
 

Burmese chronicles